Ethir Neechal is a 2013 Indian Tamil-language coming-of-age comedy drama film written and directed by R. S. Durai Senthilkumar in his directorial debut. The film stars Sivakarthikeyan, Priya Anand and Nandita Swetha. Produced by Dhanush under his studio Wunderbar Films, it was distributed by S. Madhan under the banner Vendhar Movies. Principal photography commenced on 23 July 2012, and was ended on 22 February 2013. The music for the film is composed by Anirudh Ravichander, with cinematography performed by Velraj and editing by Kishore Te. The film was released on 1 May 2013 to generally positive reviews and became a blockbuster.

Plot 
In 1985, in rural Tanjore a woman named Sivagami has complications while giving birth. Sivagami's husband prays to his native deity that if she delivers his baby successfully, he would name the baby with the name of the deity. The baby is born without any problems and as per the wish, they name the baby Kunjithapadham. As a boy, Kunjithapadham faces many problems and embarrassments due to his name, as his peer mates call him "Kunju" or "Kunji" (the private part of the male body). He decides to change his name, but his mother falls severely ill, and he prays to God that he would never change his name. His mother recovers, and they move to Chennai.

Years later, Sivagami dies. Kunjithapadam's friend Peter advises him to change his name in order to have a change in his life. After meeting an astrologer Gunasekara Raja, he legally renames himself "Harish". He also changes residence and job. Luck starts to him from that day onwards. He falls in love with Geetha, a school teacher, and succeeds in winning her heart. He later gets a job, and life goes smoothly for him. One day, his lottery ticket hits victory, and he must cash it in for a TV as a prize. However, the lottery has registered his earlier name as "Kunjithapadham". He gets the TV using peter, but Geetha finds out his true name and berates him for lying to her about his name. She tells him that he needs to succeed at something in life in order to win her heart.

Harish decides to participate in the coming Chennai Marathon. He meets with a trainer, J. Prakash alias JP, who takes him to his former student Valli, who had quit athletics. She agrees to train Harish. Later, he sees her crying in the terrace with a photo of her deceased father. Harish asks her to tell her past. Valli was a naturally talented athlete from her young days. Her father supported her talent and spoke with many men to get her past many tournaments. She got into a state level tournament where she beat the rookie of the corrupt coach Raja Singh. Infuriated, Raja Singh accused Valli of failing a gender verification test. The board punished Valli and stopped her from participating. Heartbroken, Valli's father died of a heart attack. JP then met with an accident.

Hearing this flashback, Harish is moved and decides to win the marathon. Geetha also urges him to win it for the sake of Valli. During the marathon, Harish faces stiff competition from another one of Raja Singh's rookies, but he eventually wins the race and publicly reveals Valli's innocence. Raja Singh is arrested, and Valli resumes athletics. Harish later opens and runs a training academy under his original name. A man named Dinakaran, acting on Harish's advice, proposes his love to Valli, and she accepts.

Cast 

 Sivakarthikeyan as Kunjithapatham / Harish
 Priya Anand as Geetha
 Nandita Swetha as Valli
 Sharath Lohitashwa as Valli's father (dubbed by M. S. Bhaskar)
 Sathish as Peter, Harish's friend
 Jayaprakash as Coach J. Prakash (JP)
 Ravi Prakash as Raja Singh
 Nithya Sree as Geetha's friend
 Manobala as Numerologist Gunasekara Raja
 Swaminathan as Paavadaisamy, later changed by Numerologist as Google
 Surekha Vani as Sivagami, Kunjithapatham's mother
 Pasanga Sivakumar as Kunjithapatham's father
 Madhan Bob as Kunjithapatham's manager
 Aarthi as lady at cinema
 Suza Kumar as Kunjithapatham's love interest
 RJ Balaji as himself (host of Chennai Marathon)
 Dhanush as Soup Boy (special appearance in the song "Local Boys")
 Nayanthara as item number (special appearance in the song "Local Boys")
 Anirudh Ravichander as Bar Waiter (cameo appearance)
 Dinesh as Dinakaran, Sights Valli (guest appearance)

Production

Development 
Dhanush signed up actor Sivakarthikeyan in his maiden production venture, directed by newcomer R. S. Durai Senthilkumar, a former assistant of Vetrimaaran. Priya Anand was signed up as heroine. She revealed, that Ethir Neechal is a city-based story without cheap comedy, vulgar dialogues or inappropriate scenes. The film's title was derived from the 1968 film of the same name. It was reported that Dhansika of Aravaan fame was cast as the second heroine. Soon after Dhansika left the project, Vasundhara Das was chosen to reprise the role. However Nandita Swetha of Attakathi fame was signed in, rehearsing the role of an athlete. Anirudh Ravichander was hired as the music director, after his debut film 3. The film's technical crew included Velraj as the cinematographer, Kishore Te as the editor, G. Durairaj handling the art direction, Anu Parthasarathy as the costume designer, Stunt Silva choreographing the action sequences and Baba Bhaskar as dance choreographer.

Filming 
The film's photo shoot involving Siva Karthikeyan and Priya Anand happened at the Set Fire Studios, Chennai on 7 June 2012. The principal photography for the film was commenced on 23 July 2012, with the first shot took by Balu Mahendra. Dhanush and Nayanthara will be seen in a special appearance, dancing together in the Kuthu folk dance number Sathiyama Nee Enakku (Local Boys), with Nayanthara designing costumes for herself. The song was shot in Nagercoil at a Punjabi dhabha restaurant. The film's shooting wrapped up on 22 February 2013, with the post production activities, being commenced after the shoot which was completed on 24 April 2013.

Music 

The soundtrack features six songs that belonged to varied genres; Vaali, Dhanush and R. S. Durai Senthilkumar penned lyrics for two songs each. For the title track "Ethir Neechal" composer Anirudh hired Punjabi rapper Yo Yo Honey Singh, and Adhi from the duo Hiphop Tamizha, to croon the rap versions of the song. The album's final mixing took place in Mumbai.

It was announced that Sony Music had brought the marketing rights for the film's soundtrack album. The soundtrack was initially slated to be released on 20 December 2012. However it was not confirmed from official sources. The making of the album was launched by the film's crew members, prior to the audio launch.

Release 
Initially, it was speculated that Sun Pictures had acquired the distribution rights of the film. However, it was proved untrue. The distribution rights of the film were secured by Vendhar Movies. The satellite rights of the film were purchased by STAR Vijay. Ethir Neechal was initially scheduled to release on April, later being pushed to 1 May 2013. The theatrical trailer of the film was released on 13 April 2013. The film was given a U certificate by the Censor Board with no cuts.

Ethir Neechal was released in 300 screens across Tamil Nadu on 1 May 2013, clashing with Soodhu Kavvum and Moondru Per Moondru Kaadhal. Apart from the Tamil Nadu release, the film was simultaneously released in the US, by Gramaphone LLC, which acquired the distribution rights. The film's success was celebrated at the Victoria Hall in Geneva, Switzerland, along with audio functions of three other films distribuited by Vendhar Movies.

Reception

Critical reception 
The Times of India gave 3 out of 5 stars stating "The first half of Ethir Neechal follows the current Tamil cinema formula of ‘laughs first, plot next’." Behindwoods gave 3 out of 5 stars stating it as "A wholesome package which has something in it for everyone." Baradwaj Rangan for The Hindu wrote "Sivakarthikeyan looks like he’s getting there — he’s not yet a star, at least in the leading-man sense,[sic] he gets a feature-length platform to display his comic chops". The New Indian Express stated "Ethir Neechal is a mild passable entertainer". News18 stated "The film starts off like every other romantic-comedy with adequate amount of comedy and drama, but there's hardly anything spectacular to rave about, including the story." S. Saraswathi of Rediff gave 3.5 out of 5 stating "Ethir Neechal is a simple city-based romantic comedy that is guaranteed to provide some wholesome family entertainment." Indiaglitz gave 3.5 out of 5 stating "A romcom and a sports film , put together makes you smile and inspire."

Box office 
The film opened 80 – 90% occupancy on first day collected .

References

External links 

2013 films
Athletics films
2010s sports comedy films
Films shot in Tiruchirappalli
Films scored by Anirudh Ravichander
2010s Tamil-language films
Indian sports comedy films
2013 directorial debut films
2013 comedy films